Marengaz (also Romanized as Mārengāz and Mārān Gāz; also known as Marangās) is a village in Ab Barik Rural District, in the Central District of Sonqor County, Kermanshah Province, Iran. At the 2006 census, its population was 1,099, in 259 families.

References 

Populated places in Sonqor County